The 6th Robert Awards ceremony was held in 1989 in Copenhagen, Denmark. Organized by the Danish Film Academy, the awards honoured the best in Danish and foreign film of 1988.

Honorees

Best Danish Film 
  – Søren Kragh-Jacobsen

Best Screenplay 
 Søren Kragh-Jacobsen –

Best Actor in a Leading Role 
 Börje Ahlstedt –

Best Actress in a Leading Role 
  -

Best Actor in a Supporting Role 
 Erik Mørk –

Best Actress in a Supporting Role 
 Harriet Andersson –

Best Cinematography 
 Dan Laustsen –

Best Production Design 
 Palle Nybo Arestrup –

Best Costume Design 
 Annelise Hauberg – Katinka

Best Sound Design 
 Niels Arild Nielsen –

Best Editing 
 Leif Axel Kjeldsen –

Best Score 
 Jacob Groth –

Best Documentary Short 
 Lys – Jens Jørgen Thorsen

Best Short Featurette 
 Nanna og Pernille – Eddie Thomas Petersen

See also 

 1989 Bodil Awards

References

External links 
  

1988 film awards
1989 in Denmark
Robert Awards ceremonies
1980s in Copenhagen